Black Midnight is a 1949 American Western film directed by Budd Boetticher and starring Roddy McDowall, Damian O'Flynn, and Lyn Thomas.

The film was part of a three picture deal he had with Eagle Lion films. It was also known as Thunder the Great.

Cast
Roddy McDowall
Damian O'Flynn
Lyn Thomas

References

External links

Black Midnight at TCMDB

1949 films
American Western (genre) films
1949 Western (genre) films
American black-and-white films
Films directed by Budd Boetticher
1940s English-language films
1940s American films